The Magic Tour was a 1986 European concert tour by the British rock band Queen, supporting the album A Kind of Magic. The tour featured 26 shows across Western Europe and the UK, as well as one show in Sweden and one in Hungary. The two shows at Wembley Stadium on 11–12 July sold out and saw Queen play to 150,000 fans; the second concert was professionally filmed and recorded and has been released several times.

The final show of the tour, and the last live show Freddie Mercury ever performed with Queen, was at Knebworth on 9 August to a crowd of 120,000. Afterwards, Mercury made the decision to stop touring; he died five years later.

Background
The tour, featuring 26 shows, was the first series of concerts Queen had played since their set at Live Aid in July 1985, which drew rave reviews and increased the group's profile. Support acts included the Alarm, Belouis Some, Marillion, and Status Quo.

Preparations for the tour began in May 1986. The group rehearsed for four weeks, the longest they had put into preparing a stage show. They insisted on playing stadiums and outdoor venues; promoters were unsure as to whether the gigs would sell enough tickets, but they were met with high demand.

As well as new material such as "One Vision" and "Who Wants to Live Forever", the group decided to re-introduce some older songs and an acoustic rock 'n' roll medley into the set. The final part of the show was a repeat of the six songs Queen had played at Live Aid. A new song, "Friends Will Be Friends", was added as the final encore between "We Will Rock You" and "We Are The Champions". Freddie Mercury asked his friend Diana Moseley to design stage clothes for the band, including a large crown and gown which he wore at the end of the show. Roger Taylor said the new stage show would make "Ben Hur look like the Muppets".

Itinerary
The tour began on 7 June 1986 in Stockholm. During the 21 June concert at the Maimarktgelände, Mannheim, Marillion frontman Fish sang "Tutti Frutti" with Mercury. Five days later at the Waldbühne, West Berlin, the group played an impromptu version of Led Zeppelin's "Immigrant Song". A cover of Shirley Bassey's "Big Spender" was subsequently re-added to the set, having been regularly featured in the group's early days.

The concert at Slane Castle on 5 July was marred by bad weather and crowd violence. The group played St James' Park, Newcastle, on 9 July. All profits for the concert were donated to Save The Children Fund. Support band INXS were delayed because of traffic. During the show, Mercury told the audience about rumours that Queen would disband, and flatly denied them.

All 72,000 tickets for the 11 July show at Wembley Stadium sold out quickly, so a second date was added for the following night. The group played for over 150,000 people over the two nights. The first was played during bad weather, but the second was clear and filmed by Tyne Tees and recorded by Capital Radio for a future television and radio broadcast. Giant inflatable models representing the cartoon version of the group on the A Kind of Magic cover were released; three were caught by the crowd, while one landed in Chelmsford, some miles away. During the show, Mercury addressed the audience, again denying rumours that Queen were splitting up, adding "we're gonna stay together until we fucking well die". After the second show, Mercury played an impromptu set at Kensington Roof Gardens with Fish, Samantha Fox and Gary Glitter.

The concert at the Népstadion, Budapest, on 27 July was the first concert by a major rock group behind the Iron Curtain. As well as 80,000 tickets selling out, a further estimated 45,000 people listened to the group outside. Some fans had travelled from as far away as Poland to see the concert. During the show, the group performed an acoustic arrangement of the traditional Hungarian folk song "Tavaszi Szél Vizet Áraszt". Mercury wrote the lyrics on the palm of his hand.

The Knebworth concert on 9 August 1986 was added to the end of the tour because earlier dates at Wembley had sold out. 120,000 fans attended, making it the group's biggest UK concert.  The stage featured 5,000 amplifiers,  of cable and a  video screen. It was the last live concert the classic line-up of Queen ever played. Henry Lytton-Cobbold, owner of Knebworth, later said he felt it was one of the best Queen gigs, but owing to an oversight, nobody remembered to tape video footage of the concert, although an audio recording survives along with handheld audience footage. A photograph of a swarm of helicopters branded under the 'magic' emblem was used for promotional purposes.

The tour played to more than 400,000 fans, and earned the group £11 million.

Aftermath
After the tour, Mercury told his bandmates that he did not want to do any more large-scale shows. In spring 1987, he was diagnosed as having AIDS. When the group reconvened to record The Miracle in 1989, the press were informed that Mercury wanted to "break the cycle of album, tour, album, tour" and consequently the album would not have any accompanying live performances. He died on 24 November 1991. Queen did not undertake another full tour until 19 years later, when the Queen + Paul Rodgers Tour began in March 2005. By then, John Deacon had retired from music, and did not take part.

Releases
Several concerts from the tour have been released commercially. The album Live Magic, containing greatly edited highlights, was released in December 1986 and was a top 5 hit. The second Wembley gig has been released several times. The full audio was released as a CD Live at Wembley '86 in 1992. A video, Queen at Wembley was released in 1990, containing only part of the show, with edits. It was followed by the full concert on DVD in 2003. The Budapest show has been released as Live in Budapest on VHS and Laserdisc (later re-released and retitled as Hungarian Rhapsody: Queen Live in Budapest in 2012).

Setlists

Typical setlist

"One Vision"
"Tie Your Mother Down"
"In the Lap of the Gods… Revisited"
"Seven Seas of Rhye"
"Tear It Up"
"A Kind of Magic"
"Under Pressure"
"Another One Bites the Dust"
"Who Wants to Live Forever"
"I Want to Break Free"
"Impromptu"
"Guitar Solo"
"Now I'm Here"
"Love of My Life"
"Is This the World We Created...?"
"(You're So Square) Baby I Don't Care"
"Hello Mary Lou (Goodbye Heart)"
"Tutti Frutti"
"Bohemian Rhapsody"
"Hammer to Fall"
"Crazy Little Thing Called Love"Encore
"Radio Ga Ga"Encore
"We Will Rock You"
"Friends Will Be Friends"
"We Are the Champions"
"God Save the Queen"

Selected setlists

Tour dates

Notes

Personnel
Freddie Mercury – lead vocals, piano, rhythm guitar ("Crazy Little Thing Called Love")
Brian May – electric guitar, acoustic guitar, backing vocals, keyboards ("Who Wants to Live Forever")
Roger Taylor – drums, tambourine, backing vocals
John Deacon – bass guitar, backing vocals
Additional musicians
Spike Edney – keyboard, piano, backing vocals, rhythm guitar ("Hammer to Fall")

See also
List of highest-attended concerts

References

Citations

Sources

External links
Queen Concerts

1986 concert tours
Queen (band) concert tours